The Baku 2014-15 season is Baku's seventeenth Azerbaijan Premier League season. They will compete in the 2014–15 Azerbaijan Premier League and the 2014–15 Azerbaijan Cup. It is their second season with Milinko Pantić as their manager.

Milinko Pantić left the club by mutual consent on 24 July 2014, with Ibrahim Uzundzha being appointed as the club's new manager on 12 August 2014.

Squad

Transfers

Summer

In:

Out:

Winter

In:

Out:

Friendlies

Competitions

Azerbaijan Premier League

Results summary

Results

League table

Azerbaijan Cup

Squad statistics

Appearances and goals

|-
|colspan="14"|Players who away from the club on loan:
|-
|colspan="14"|Players who appeared for Baku no longer at the club:

|}

Goal scorers

Disciplinary record

Notes
Qarabağ have played their home games at the Tofiq Bahramov Stadium since 1993 due to the ongoing situation in Quzanlı.
Araz-Naxçıvan were excluded from the Azerbaijan Premier League on 17 November 2014, with all their results being annulled.

References

External links 
 FK Baku at Soccerway.com

FC Baku seasons
Baku